Rougatsiarikos is a kind of a Greek traditional dance from Thessaly, Greece.

See also
Music of Greece
Greek dances

References
Pουγκατσιάρικος

Greek dances